The Madonna del Sasso is a sanctuary and pilgrimage church in Orselina, above the city of Locarno in Switzerland. It is the principal sight and goal of pilgrimage in the city.

The founding of the sanctuary goes back to a vision of the Virgin Mary that the Franciscan brother Bartolomeo d'Ivrea experienced in the night of 14/15 August 1480. The interior is highly decorated, and a platform has views of the city.

The sanctuary is linked to Locarno city centre by the Locarno–Madonna del Sasso funicular.

On 14 August 1880, the Vatican Chapter under Pope Leo XIII issued a Pontifical decree which crowned the venerated image via Papal legate Paolo Angelo Ballerini, following festivities of August 15–16, marking the 400 years of its Marian apparition.

External links
 
 Sanctuary of the Madonna del Sasso (ticino.ch)
 Associazione Pro Restauro Madonna del Sasso

Shrines to the Virgin Mary
Cultural property of national significance in Ticino
Tourist attractions in Ticino
Churches in Ticino
Roman Catholic shrines in Switzerland